William Bernard "Rip" Scherer Jr. (born August 3, 1952) is an former American football coach. He served at the head football coach at James Madison University from 1991 to 1994 and the University of Memphis from 1995 to 200, compiling a career college football head coaching record of 51–63. In 2018, he was named tight ends coach for the Los Angeles Chargers of the National Football League (NFL)

Scherer is the cousin of Kevin Colbert, Vice President of Football Operations for the Pittsburgh Steelers. He is the son of longtime Pittsburgh-area high school coach William "Rip" Scherer.

Head coaching record

References

1952 births
Living people
Alabama Crimson Tide football coaches
Arizona Wildcats football coaches
Carolina Panthers coaches
Cleveland Browns coaches
Colorado Buffaloes football coaches
Georgia Tech Yellow Jackets football coaches
Hawaii Rainbow Warriors football coaches
James Madison Dukes football coaches
Kansas Jayhawks football coaches
Los Angeles Chargers coaches
Memphis Tigers football coaches
NC State Wolfpack football coaches
Penn State Nittany Lions football coaches
Southern Miss Golden Eagles football coaches
Virginia Cavaliers football coaches
William & Mary Tribe football players